Dann James Bilardello (born May 26, 1959) is a former Major League Baseball (MLB) catcher and former manager of the Palm Beach Cardinals of the Florida State League in the St. Louis Cardinals minor league system.  A product of Cabrillo College in Aptos, California, Bilardello has managed Cardinals minor league affiliates since .

Drafted by the Los Angeles Dodgers in the 1st round of the 1978 MLB amateur draft, Bilardello made his MLB début with the Cincinnati Reds on April 11, 1983. His rookie season was his best showing at the plate with a .238 batting average, nine home runs and 38 runs batted in in 109 games. The next season, his 41.5% caught stealing percentage led the National League. In 1985, he improved on that rate at 48.8% – catching 20 of 41 would-be base stealers – although this time he finished third. He was a poor hitter throughout his career as he received the most playing time in his rookie season. Playing in a total of eight MLB seasons, Bilardello appeared in his final game with the San Diego Padres on October 4, 1992.

Following his playing career, Bilardello managed a different team in each of four seasons in the Los Angeles Dodgers minor league system from –. All teams were between the rookie to advanced A-level. Later, he served as a roving instructor for the Cardinals. After being named the manager of the Cardinals Short Season A level New York–Penn League affiliate Batavia Muckdogs in 2010, Bilardello led the team to the Pinckney Division championship that season. He managed Batavia until . On November 7, 2013, the Cardinals again promoted Bilardello to guide the advanced A-level Palm Beach Cardinals of the Florida State League. He is currently the bench coach for the Rocket City Trash Pandas, the Double-A affiliate of the Los Angeles Angels.

Personal life
Bilardello's son Davis was drafted in the 43rd round of the 2004 MLB draft.

References

External links 

1959 births
Living people
Baseball players from California
American expatriate baseball players in Canada
Cincinnati Reds players
Montreal Expos players
Pittsburgh Pirates players
San Diego Padres players
Lethbridge Dodgers players
Clinton Dodgers players
Lodi Dodgers players
San Antonio Dodgers players
Wichita Aeros players
Denver Zephyrs players
Indianapolis Indians players
Omaha Royals players
Vancouver Canadians players
Buffalo Bisons (minor league) players
Las Vegas Stars (baseball) players
Norfolk Tides players
Winnipeg Goldeyes players
Major League Baseball catchers
Minor league baseball managers